Amazon Freevee is an American ad-supported video-on-demand (VOD) streaming service owned by Amazon, with original and licensed programming.

Functionality
Freevee content is presented to Amazon Prime Video users seamlessly within Prime's smart TV app interface. Prime's suggestion algorithm includes this content throughout the browsing experience and within the 'continue watching' queue Freevee also functions as a standalone app, for use by non-Prime users.

History

Amazon Freevee launched as a free, ad-supported video channel by the Amazon-owned online database IMDb in January 2019, under the name IMDb Freedive, before becoming IMDb TV five months later; it was rebranded to its current name on April 28, 2022. 

The Video on demand service is available in the United States, as well as the UK and Germany through Amazon and IMDb's websites as well as on all Amazon Fire devices.

On June 17, 2019, IMDb Freedive announced its rebranding to IMDb TV. Signing new deals with Warner Bros., Sony Pictures Entertainment and MGM Studios (which parent company Amazon later acquired on March 17, 2022), the streaming service began offering new content. Amazon announced that it would be moving IMDb TV's content team to within Amazon Studios on February 20, 2020, with the goal of developing original programming under new IMDb TV co-heads.

In September 2021, Amazon announced the launch of IMDb TV in the United Kingdom; before then, it was available only in the United States.

On April 13, 2022, it was announced that the service would be rebranded as Amazon Freevee beginning on April 27. It was also announced that it would launch in Germany later that year, and would expand its original programming by 70% in 2022. The rebrand occurred on April 28, 2022. Its first announced moves post-rebrand included renewing Bosch: Legacy pre-premiere as well as Top Class, ordering America's Test Kitchen: The Next Generation and a new series adaptation of Black Beauty and expanding Play-Doh: Squished beyond its holiday special.

On August 3, 2022, Amazon Freevee was launched in Germany.

Content

Original programming

A revival of the 2008 crime drama series Leverage was ordered by IMDb TV, making it the first major original series for the streaming service.

On October 3, 2019, IMDb TV announced it licensed the Canadian animated series Corner Gas Animated as a branded original series, joining the live-action comedy franchise Corner Gas and the feature film Corner Gas: The Movie, which were both on the streaming platform.

IMDb TV acquired the rights to Eleventh Hour Films and Sony Pictures Television's young-adult espionage series Alex Rider, premiering a series adaptation on November 13, 2020.

On October 29, 2020, Amazon Studios announced it would produce for the service the successor program to Judge Judy, entitled Judy Justice and still starring former Manhattan Family Court Judge Judith Sheindlin. Production on Judy Justice began as CBS's long-running Judge Judy ended on July 23, 2021. Judy Justice premiered on IMDb TV on November 1, 2021. With significantly high stakes in the program, Amazon ordered 120 episodes for the first season alone which concluded on April 15, 2022, and served as the largest initial order package for a streaming series. Amazon has bargained on Sheindlin to attract her legions of viewers and fanfare from Judge Judy over to their streaming service for Judy Justice. Towards the end of the first season, Judy Justice was granted a second season after it was hailed as a big hit for Freevee with record viewership hours for the streaming service (viewership results measured by hours watched as opposed to rating numbers as Nielsen ratings does not cover streaming services).

Sheindlin's personal production team will bring another court show to Freevee, entitled Tribunal. The program will feature her longtime Judge Judy program bailiff, Petri Hawkins-Byrd. The series will be presented in the form of a 3-judge panel, like Hot Bench (another production from Sheindlin, only for CBS). Tribunal will be presided over by now former Hot Bench judges, Tanya Acker and Patricia DiMango, along with Sheindlin's son, former district attorney Adam Levy.

On February 22, 2021, it was announced that Norman Lear had set up two projects at IMDb TV, half-hour long comedy Clean Slate and hour-long drama Loteria.

On April 13, 2022, it was announced that a spinoff of the Prime Video series Bosch, titled Bosch: Legacy, would premiere on the service on May 6, 2022, and that the coming-of-age series High School, based on the memoir by Tegan and Sara and adapted by Clea DuVall, would premiere in 2022.  It was also announced that the service would add original films to its slate, beginning with the romantic comedy Love Accidentally, starring Brenda Song and Aaron O'Connell.

Third-party content
IMDb TV announced it would begin streaming the NBC drama Chicago Fire on December 6, 2019, making the deal the biggest single licensing pact to date for the streaming service. In addition, IMDb TV announced it would also begin streaming all five seasons of Universal Television's Friday Night Lights starting on December 31, 2019.

In February 2020, IMDb TV acquired the rights to more than twenty scripted TV titles controlled by Walt Disney Direct-to-Consumer & International division and began streaming several Star Trek films in June and July 2020. Starting July 15, 2020, IMDb TV began streaming all 92 episodes of the AMC series Mad Men after completing a licensing deal with Lionsgate.

In July 2021, Amazon and Universal Pictures reached a multi-year deal to bring Universal's films to IMDb TV. As part of the deal, titles from Universal's library would become available, making films including The Invisible Man eligible to stream on IMDb TV for free. Most of the studio's titles will be also available ad-free on Prime Video, including future theatrical releases following their first pay window and four months after being released on Peacock.

On November 3, 2021, IMDb TV UK began streaming content from FilmRise, MovieSphere, MagellanTV and SPI's Docustream, along with program-themed channels based on shows Deadly Women, Are We There Yet?, Bridezillas, Unsolved Mysteries, This Old House, MythBusters, and Hell's Kitchen.
 
In November 2022, it was announced the company was entering a partnership with Fremantle, to launch a revival of soap opera  Neighbours, which will go into filming in early 2023 and broadcast in the second half of 2023.

References

Amazon (company)
Internet television streaming services
Television channels and stations established in 2019
Television networks in the United States